Aref Aghasi Kolahsorkhi { (born 2 January 1997) is an Iranian footballer who plays as a defender for Esteghlal in Persian Gulf Pro League.

International career
He made his debut against Algeria on 12 June 2022 in a friendly match.

Honours
Foolad
Hazfi Cup: 2020–21
Iranian Super Cup: 2021

References 

1997 births
Living people
Iranian footballers
Association football defenders
Tractor S.C. players
Foolad FC players
Esteghlal F.C. players
People from Izeh
Iran under-20 international footballers
Sportspeople from Khuzestan province